The men's 300 metre free rifle prone event was one of five free rifle events of the competitions in the Shooting at the 1900 Summer Olympics events in Paris. It was held from August 3 to August 5, 1900. 30 shooters from 6 nations competed, with five shooters per team. Medals were given for individual high scores in each of the three positions, overall individual high scores, and the scores of the five shooters were summed to give a team score. Achille Paroche of France won the gold medal in the prone event, with Anders Peter Nielsen of Denmark taking silver and Ole Østmo bronze.

Background

This was the only appearance of the men's 300 metre prone rifle event. A three-positions event was also included in 1900 (summing the scores of the standing, kneeling, and prone competitions); the three-positions event continued, but future Games would not have separate prone-position events in this format.

Léon Moreaux of France was the 1898 World Champion, the only world champion to compete in Paris. Reigning world champion Jesse Wallingford of Great Britain did not compete. The Olympic event doubled as the 1900 world championship.

Competition format

The competition had each shooter fire 40 shots from the prone position. The target was 1 metre in diameter, with 10 scoring rings; targets were set at a distance of 300 metres. Thus, the maximum score possible was 400 points. The scores from this event were combined with the other two positions (standing and kneeling) to give a three-positions individual score as well as a team score.

Schedule

Results

Each shooter fired 40 shots, for a total possible of 400 points.

References

 International Olympic Committee medal winners database
 De Wael, Herman. Herman's Full Olympians: "Shooting 1900". Accessed 3 March 2006.
 

Men's rifle military prone
Men's 300m prone